Dongxing District is a district of Neijiang City, Sichuan Province, China.

Districts of Sichuan
Neijiang